Horsfieldia lancifolia is a species of plant in the family Myristicaceae. It is a tree endemic to Sulawesi in Indonesia.

References

lancifolia
Endemic flora of Sulawesi
Trees of Sulawesi
Near threatened flora of Asia
Taxonomy articles created by Polbot